Pixley Township is one of twelve townships in Clay County, Illinois, USA.  As of the 2010 census, its population was 589 and it contained 284 housing units.

Geography

Cities, towns, villages
 Sailor Springs (east three-quarters)

Unincorporated towns
 Ingraham
 Wendelin
(This list is based on USGS data and may include former settlements.)

Cemeteries
The township contains these twelve cemeteries: Ditter, Ingraham, Leonard, Levitte, McKinney, Reed, Saint Johns, Smith, Weidner, Wendelin-Holy Cross, Wesley and Woods.

Demographics

School districts
 Clay City Community Unit District 10
 Jasper County Community Unit School District 1
 West Richland Community Unit School District 2

Political districts
 Illinois' 19th congressional district
 State House District 108
 State Senate District 54

References
 
 United States Census Bureau 2007 TIGER/Line Shapefiles
 United States National Atlas

External links
 City-Data.com
 Illinois State Archives

Townships in Clay County, Illinois
Townships in Illinois